A weekend warrior is someone who engages in sports or outdoor pursuits at the weekend.

Weekend warrior may also refer to:

Music
Weekend Warrior (album), an album by Biz Markie in 2003
Weekend Warriors (album), an album by Ted Nugent in 1978
"Weekend Warrior", a song by Iron Maiden from Fear of the Dark in 1992
"Weekend Warrior", a song by Ministry from Relapse in 2012
"Weekend Warriors", a song by Uriah Heep from Head First in 1983
"Weekend Warriors", a song by A Change Of Pace from Prepare the Masses in 2006

Other media
Weekend Warrior, a computer game developed by Pangea Software
Weekend Warriors (film), a 1986 comedy
"Weekend Warriors", an episode of the TV series Psych
Weekend Warriors, a program broadcase by HGTV Canada
Weekend Warriors MMA, a mobile game developed by MDickie

Other uses
A nickname for the visitors of the Defqon.1 Festival

See also